was a Japanese field hockey player who competed in the 1932 Summer Olympics. He was born in Dalian, China. In 1932 he was a member of the Japanese field hockey team, which won the silver medal. He played two matches as back.

References

External links
 

1909 births
Year of death missing
Sportspeople from Dalian
Japanese male field hockey players
Olympic field hockey players of Japan
Field hockey players at the 1932 Summer Olympics
Olympic silver medalists for Japan
Olympic medalists in field hockey
Medalists at the 1932 Summer Olympics
20th-century Japanese people